The ACT and Southern NSW Rugby Union is the governing body for rugby union in the Australian Capital Territory and southern regions of New South Wales. The union is represented by one team in the Super Rugby competition, the Brumbies. The ACT is also home to the Canberra Vikings in the National Rugby Championship.

History
The union was founded in 1937 as the Federal Capital Territory Rugby Union (FCTRU). It became the Australian Capital Territory Rugby Union (ACTRU) in 1939, and eventually the ACT and Southern NSW Rugby Union. It received its current name prior to the 2005 Super 12 season, when the Far South Coast and Southern Inland unions of New South Wales joined the ACT and Monaro Rugby Unions. This change also led to the former ACT Brumbies being renamed Brumbies Rugby.

Jurisdiction
The ACT and Southern New South Wales Union has jurisdiction over the southern-most bordering towns of New South Wales from the eastern coast over to Albury-Wodonga and Deniliquin. It also includes Griffith, Young, Yass, Taralga, as well as Goulburn, Batemans Bay, Wagga Wagga and Canberra.

Competitions 
The ACT and Southern NSW Rugby Union administers three senior competitions:

 ACT Rugby Union
 Far South Coast Rugby Union
 Southern Inland Rugby Union

ACTRU Premier Division (John I Dent Cup)

Far South Coast Rugby Union (Incorporated into ACTRU Lower Grades) 
This union is officially affiliated with the ACT and Southern NSW Rugby Union instead of the NSW union.

Junior Teams 

 Bermagui 
 FSC Falcons (Tathra)

Southern Inland Rugby Union 
This union is officially affiliated with the ACT and Southern NSW Rugby Union instead of the NSW union.

Clubs

Junior Clubs 

  Cootamundra Tri-Colours (Seniors play in Central West Rugby Union)
  Deniliquin Drovers (No seniors)
  Temora Tuskers (Seniors play in Central West Rugby Union)
  West Wyalong Weevils (Seniors play in Central West Rugby Union)
  Young Yabbies (Seniors play in Central West Rugby Union)

Affiliated Clubs 

  Hillston Hogs (invitational team)

Former Clubs 
 Junee Rams

ACT representative teams
  Coached by Frank O'Rourke, the home team had played its inaugural match only three months earlier.

The team's original strip featured an all gold jersey with two green bands. They defeated the Hawkesbury College at the Country Carnival earlier in 1938, and later that season won against the Bathurst side. Three players from the Territory team were selected for NSW Combined Country to play Sydney that year.  

Rugby in Canberra came of age in the 1970s. ACT scored a 17–11 away win over Queensland in 1972,   

 

The name "Canberra Kookaburras" was used for the ACT representative team from 1989, but it was to be a further five years before the Canberra Kookaburra club was officially founded.

Australian Rugby Shield 
The Vikings entered the Australian Rugby Shield in 2006, playing as the "ACT & Southern NSW Vikings" following the renaming of the ACT Rugby Union after its expansion into Southern New South Wales the previous season. The team had two close matches against NSW Country and Perth Gold during the season, but managed to progress undefeated through the three pool games, semi-final and final to win the competition and take the shield. The Vikings played the Melbourne Axemen in the grand final at Viking Park and never looked back after the third minute when inside centre Josh Staniforth scored the first of the side's five tries for the match in a 36–10 win.
In 2022, with the Revival of Australian Rugby Shield ACT and Southern New South Wales Griffins were crowned champions defeating NSW Country 34-31 in the Grand Final at Brighton Oval, Adelaide.

Honours
Australian Rugby Shield Winners (2006, 2022)

See also
 Rugby union in the Australian Capital Territory
 Brumbies
 ACTRU Premier Division
 ACT Veterans Rugby Club

References

External links
Brumbies Rugby - official site of ACT and Southern NSW Rugby Union
Australian Capital Territory Rugby Union - unofficial fan site

Australian rugby union governing bodies
Rugby union in the Australian Capital Territory
Rugby union governing bodies in New South Wales
Ru
Sports organizations established in 1937
1937 establishments in Australia